Johor Bahru is a federal constituency in Johor Bahru District, Johor, Malaysia, that has been represented in the Dewan Rakyat since 1955 to 1959 and 1974 to present.

The federal constituency was created in the 1955 redistribution and is mandated to return a single member to the Dewan Rakyat under the first past the post voting system.

Demographics

History

Polling districts 
According to the federal gazette issued on 31 October 2022, the Johor Bahru constituency is divided into 40 polling districts.

Representation history

State constituency

Current state assembly members

Local governments

Election results

References

Johor federal constituencies
Constituencies established in 1955
Constituencies disestablished in 1959